Evgeniia Eduardovna Frolkina (born 28 July 1997) is a Russian basketball player. She competed in the 2020 Summer Olympics. Her twin sister Olga is also a professional basketball player.

References

1997 births
Living people
3x3 basketball players at the 2020 Summer Olympics
Medalists at the 2020 Summer Olympics
Olympic medalists in 3x3 basketball
Olympic 3x3 basketball players of Russia
Russian women's 3x3 basketball players
Russian women's basketball players
Small forwards
Russian twins
Twin sportspeople
Olympic silver medalists for the Russian Olympic Committee athletes